The 2019 Cup of Nations is the inaugural edition of the Cup of Nations, an international women's football tournament, consisting of a series of friendly games, that was held in Australia from 28 February to 6 March 2019. The four national teams involved in the tournament registered a squad of 23 players.

The age listed for each player is on 28 February 2019, the first day of the tournament. The numbers of caps and goals listed for each player do not include any matches played after the start of tournament. A flag is included for coaches that are of a different nationality than their own national team.

Squads

Argentina
Coach: Carlos Borrello

The final squad was announced on 23 February 2019.

Australia
Coach: Ante Milicic

The final squad was announced on 21 February 2019. On 26 February 2019, Chloe Logarzo was replaced by Amy Harrison, after the former didn't recover from an ankle injury.

New Zealand
Coach:  Tom Sermanni

The final squad was announced on 29 January 2019.

South Korea
Coach: Yoon Deok-yeo

The final squad was announced on 26 December 2018.

Player representation

By club
Clubs with 3 or more players represented are listed.

By club nationality

By club federation

By representatives of domestic league

References

2019 Cup of Nations
2018–19 in Australian women's soccer
2019 in women's association football
February 2019 sports events in Australia
March 2019 sports events in Australia
Soccer in New South Wales
Soccer in Queensland
Soccer in Victoria (Australia)
Cup of Nations (Australia)